Warren Kendall Lewis (21 August 1882 – 9 March 1975) was an MIT professor who has been called the father of modern chemical engineering.  He co-authored an early major textbook on the subject which essentially introduced the concept of unit operations. He also co-developed the Houdry process under contract to The Standard Oil Company of New Jersey (now ExxonMobil) into modern fluid catalytic cracking with Edwin R. Gilliland, another MIT professor.

Life
Lewis was born in Laurel, Delaware, on 21 August 1882 and went to MIT to study engineering.  He took the chemical engineering option from the Department of Chemistry, matriculating in 1901.  This so engaged him that he went for postgraduate study of physical chemistry in Breslau, Germany, receiving the degree of DSc in 1908.  Shortly after, he returned to MIT to join the teaching staff.

In 1909 Lewis published a paper on "The Theory of Fractional Distillation" which was the basis for subsequent chemical engineering calculation methods. (He later authored 19 patents on distillation.) In 1920 he became the first head of the newly formed Department of Chemical Engineering at MIT a position he held for 13 years before returning to teaching and research.

In November 1942 Lewis was appointed to chair a committee to survey the Manhattan Project and review all aspects of the bomb research and development, partly because of du Pont’s doubts about the plutonium process. Their report dated December 4 supported the plutonium project. It also recommended concentrating on the gaseous diffusion process for enriching uranium and building only a small electromagnetic plant. Conant supported building a large electromagnetic plant, which Nichols says was essential to dropping the bomb in August rather than months later. The committee also suggested suitable industrial organisations and ... furnished us with a blueprint for the complete industrial organization of the project which Groves mostly followed ... and gave us more confidence concerning the feasibility of producing sufficient quantities of fissionable material. In April–May 1944 another committee under Lewis recommended construction of the S-50 thermal diffusion plant developed by Philip Abelson of the US Navy.

He was made professor emeritus in 1948 and continued to work within the department until his death on 9 March 1975.

Honors
1936 Perkin Medal of the Society of Chemical Industry
1947 Lamme Medal of the American Society of Engineering Education
1947 Priestley Medal of the American Chemical Society.  He was the first chemical engineer to achieve the Priestley Medal.
1949 American Institute of Chemists Gold Medal
1957 E. V. Murphree Award
He is commemorated in the Warren K. Lewis Award for Chemical Engineering Education of the AIChE and in the Warren K. Lewis Lectureship at MIT.

References 

1882 births
1975 deaths
American physical chemists
American chemical engineers
American Congregationalists
American textbook writers
American male non-fiction writers
MIT School of Engineering faculty
Fluid dynamicists
National Medal of Science laureates
Manhattan Project people
20th-century American male writers